The 2022–23 Marsh One-Day Cup was the 54th season of the official List A domestic cricket competition played in Australia. Western Australia were the defending champions.

On 29 June 2022, Cricket Australia confirmed the schedule of the tournament, with the final played on 8 March 2023.

In the final, Western Australia beat Southern Australia by 181 runs to win their 16th one-day title.

Points table

  Qualified to the final

RESULT POINTS:

 Win – 4
 Tie – 2 each
 No Result – 2 each
 Loss – 0
 Bonus Point – 1 (run rate 1.25 times that of opposition)

Fixtures
Source:

Final

Television coverage
Every match of the 2022-23 Marsh Cup were streamed live by Cricket Australia through their website and the CA Live app. Kayo Sports also streamed all 22 matches from the tournament. Fox Cricket broadcast 13 matches, including the final.

References

External links
 Series home at ESPN Cricinfo
 Series home at Cricket Australia

Marsh One-Day Cup
Australian domestic limited-overs cricket tournament seasons
Marsh One-Day Cup